Mudgal Committee is a four-member committee, headed by former High Court judge Mukul Mudgal and comprising the then Additional Solicitor General of India L. Nageswara Rao and senior advocate and former cricket umpire Nilay Dutta to conduct an independent inquiry into the allegations of corruption against BCCI chief N. Srinivasan's son-in-law Gurunath Meiyappan, India Cements, and Rajasthan Royals team owner Jaipur IPS Cricket Private Ltd, as well as with the larger mandate of investigating allegations having to do with betting and spot-fixing in 2013 Indian Premier League matches and the involvement of players.

Former Indian cricket captain Sourav Ganguly was reported to have joined the committee along with retired IPS officer B B Mishra .

Committee Report 

In a report submitted to the Supreme Court on 9 February, 2014, the committee presented the following conclusions.

Gurunath Meiyappan  
 Gurunath Meiyappan's role as a team official of the Chennai Super Kings was confirmed and the allegations of betting against him stood proved. However, the allegations of matching fixing required further investigation. 
 Meiyappan had indulged in betting through Vindoo Dara Singh, who was in turn in direct communication with bookies and punters like Vikram Aggarwal; that he had placed bets both in favour of and against the Chennai Super Kings; and that he had bet on IPL matches not involving the Chennai Super Kings.
 The Committee found that Meiyappan had "violated Section 2.2.1 and 2.14 of the IPL Operational Rules for bringing the game in disrepute, Articles 2.2.1, 2.2.2 and 2.2.3 of the IPL Anti Corruption Code for his acts of betting and Articles 2.4.4 of the IPL Code of Conduct for Players and Team Offices for bringing disrepute to the game of cricket."
 The franchisee owner of the Chennai Super Kings had failed to that Meiyappan as a Team Official "had complied with the BCCI Anti-Corruption Code, IPL Operational Rules, IPL Regulations and found it in violation of Section 4.4.1 of the IPL Operational Rules and Clause 11.3 of the franchises agreement."

Raj Kundra  
 The committee reported that the allegations of betting and spot fixing against Raj Kundra, as the owner of the Jaipur Cricket Private Limited, the owners of the Rajasthan Royals needed to be further investigated.

Allegations of Spot Fixing and Match Fixing against players  
The committee noted that the allegations of spot fixing and matching fixing by S. Sreesanth, Ankeet Chavan, Ajit Chandila, Amit Singh and Siddharth Trivedi (Rajasthan Royals) on the basis of evidence provided by the Delhi Police were facing criminal trials and that adequate punishment had been imposed on them by the BCCI.

References

External links 
 Justice Mukul Mudgal, L. Nageswara Rao and Nilay Dutta, "" (A REPORT ON THE ALLEGATIONS OF BETTING AND SPOT/MATCH FIXING IN THE INDIAN PREMIER LEAGUE- SEASON 6, Volume 1, available at https://www.thehinducentre.com/migration_catalog/article22969079.ece/binary/Justice%20Mudgal%20IPL%20Report), The Hindu Centre for Politics and Public Policy, vol. 1 (February 9, 2014).

Government agencies of India
Cricket controversies
2013 in Indian cricket
Anti-corruption measures in India